Madan Mohan Punchhi (10 October 1933 – 17 June 2015) was the 28th Chief Justice of India from 18 January 1998 until his retirement on 9 October 1998.

He read law at the Faculty of Law, University of Delhi after which he began his legal career in 1955, and was appointed as a Judge of Punjab and Haryana High Court in October 1979.

In October 1989, he was appointed as Judge of the Supreme Court of India, and became Chief Justice of India in January 1998.

Post retirement, he was appointed by the Government of India as the Chairman of the Centre State relations commission, subsequently known as the Punchhi commission, which dealt with matters pertaining to the Centre-State relations in India.

He was a resident of Chandigarh.

https://highcourtchd.gov.in/sub_pages/top_menu/about/events_files/REFERANCE_03082015_CJ.pdf

External links
 Biography at http://supremecourtofindia.nic.in/

 https://nalsa.gov.in/patron-in-chief/hon-ble-mr-justice-m-m-punchhi

Chief justices of India
People from Pakpattan District
Scholars from Chandigarh
1933 births
2015 deaths
20th-century Indian lawyers
20th-century Indian judges
People from Poonch district, India
Pahari Pothwari people